André Bertrand is a French attorney expert in the area of intellectual property.

He holds a PhD from the University of Paris and an LLM from UC Berkeley (Boalt Hall), from which he graduated in  1978.

Bertrand is the author of many treatises in the area of intellectual property:  
 Privacy rights and image
 Trademark law: distinctive signs, domain names
 Music and Law: from Bach to Internet
 Internet and Law
 Copyrights and related rights
 Fashion and Law
 French law applied to unfair competition
 Trademarks, patents, draws and models
 Software protection
 The practice of law applied to credit cards, electronic methods of payments and banking telematics

Andre Bertrand is an expert of the trademark disputes over the "Yellow Pages".

See also 
 Boalt Hall

References

External links
official website of Boalt Hall
Student Organization for Advanced Legal Studies

20th-century French lawyers
UC Berkeley School of Law alumni
Living people
Year of birth missing (living people)
21st-century French lawyers